Kiester Township is a township in Faribault County, Minnesota, United States. The population was 320 at the 2000 census.

Kiester Township was organized in 1872, and named for Jacob Kiester, a local historian who afterward served as state legislator.

Geography

Minnesota State Highway 22 serves as a main route in the township.

Demographics
As of the census of 2000, there were 320 people, 120 households, and 101 families residing in the township.  The population density was 8.9 people per square mile (3.4/km2).  There were 131 housing units at an average density of 3.7/sq mi (1.4/km2).  The racial makeup of the township was 98.12% White, 0.31% African American, 0.31% Native American, 0.31% from other races, and 0.94% from two or more races. Hispanic or Latino of any race were 0.62% of the population.

There were 120 households, out of which 35.0% had children under the age of 18 living with them, 75.0% were married couples living together, 7.5% had a female householder with no husband present, and 15.8% were non-families. 13.3% of all households were made up of individuals, and 9.2% had someone living alone who was 65 years of age or older.  The average household size was 2.67 and the average family size was 2.91.

In the township the population was spread out, with 25.6% under the age of 18, 8.4% from 18 to 24, 27.2% from 25 to 44, 22.8% from 45 to 64, and 15.9% who were 65 years of age or older.  The median age was 40 years. For every 100 females, there were 122.2 males.  For every 100 females age 18 and over, there were 107.0 males.

The median income for a household in the township was $37,188, and the median income for a family was $39,205. Males had a median income of $25,208 versus $18,750 for females. The per capita income for the township was $17,258.  About 5.3% of families and 7.7% of the population were below the poverty line, including 18.8% of those under age 18 and 3.6% of those age 65 or over.

In popular culture
On June 7, 2016, a Preparation H television commercial debuted that was filmed in Kiester.

Notable people
Steve Heitzeg, composer (born 1959) — grew up on a farm near Keister.

References

Townships in Faribault County, Minnesota
Townships in Minnesota